Belgium competed at the 2011 Summer Universiade in Shenzhen, China.

Medalists

Archery

Men

Women

Mixed

Athletics

Men

Decathlon

Women

Badminton

Men

Cycling

Road
Women

Gymnastics

Artistic Gymnastics
Men

Judo

Men

Swimming 

Men

Women

Taekwondo

Men

Volleyball

Women

Weightlifting 

Men

References

Nations at the 2011 Summer Universiade
2011 in Belgian sport
2011